Agimat: Ang Mga Alamat ni Ramon Revilla presents Pepeng Agimat, more popularly known as simply Pepeng Agimat was the second installment of the Philippine weekly mini-series Agimat: Ang Mga Alamat ni Ramon Revilla ("Amulet: The Legendary Chronicles of Ramon Revilla") aired by ABS-CBN that started November 14, 2009, and ended on February 27, 2010.  The character of Pepeng Agimat is portrayed by Jolo Revilla.

Overview

1973 film
Agimat: Ang mga Alamat ni Ramon Revilla presents Pepeng Agimat is a TV adaptation of a film entitled Pepeng Agimat...Sa Daigdig ng Kababalaghan ("Pepe the Amulet...in the World of Mystery"), a 1973 film which starred Ramon Revilla, Sr. as the title role Pepeng Agimat. It also starred Gloria Romero, Rosemarie Gil, and Bella Flores. The film was directed by Tony Cayado.

1999 film

The 1973 film has also been remade on 1999. It starred Bong Revilla Jr., son of the lead actor of the original film Ramon Revilla Sr. who also participated to a cameo on the film as Apo Damon. The film also starred by Princess Punzalan who had just portrayed her signature role as Selina Matias in the movie of Mula sa Puso, Jess Lapid Jr., Al Tantay, Vanessa del Bianco, LJ Moreno, Dennis Padilla, King Gutierrez and Bong Revilla Jr.'s son Jolo Revilla who apparently is going to take the title role for the television remake of the film.

Synopsis
The second chapter in the Agimat: Ang mga Alamat ni Ramon Revilla series, Jolo Revilla plays the title role of Pepeng Agimat. Bullied in school for being the geeky and clumsy student, Pepe will discover that there is a mission he has inherited from his father that he must fulfill. He will be passed a magical amulet which he must use in vanquishing the clan of the aswang that is terrorizing Cavite. But when Pepe falls for the beautiful and mysterious lady named Lora, he will be forced to choose between his mission and his love for her.

Cast

Main cast
Jolo Revilla as Felipe "Pepe" Dimaanta, Jr.
Ramon "Bong" Revilla Jr. as Felipe "Pepe" Dimaanta, Sr.
Ai-Ai delas Alas as Gloring Dimaanta
Melissa Ricks as Lora Hizon
Ping Medina as Lucio Hizon
Jay-R Siaboc as Benjie Quizon
Lou Veloso as Tata Endo
Tess Antonio as Thelma
Shamaine Buencamino as Elena Hizon
Helga Krapf as Sheila Romualdez
Josef Elizalde as Ryan Guerzon
Izzy Canillo as Pepito Dimaanta

Special Participation
Emilio Garcia as Amang Aswang
Ana Capri as Victoria/Ynang Mananaggal
Empress Schuck as Helen San Simarin
Bernard Palanca as Romulo
Roxanne Guinoo as Myra

Award
2010 PMPC Star Awards for Television's "Best Horror/Fantasy Program"

See also
Agimat: Ang Mga Alamat ni Ramon Revilla

References

External links
Pepeng Agimat

2009 Philippine television series debuts
2010 Philippine television series endings
ABS-CBN drama series
Television series by Dreamscape Entertainment Television
Filipino-language television shows